The Czech-Slovak Protective Society (CSPS), which became the Czecho Slovakian Association, was an organization supporting the welfare of Czech and Slovak immigrants to the United States. The Czech-Slovak Protective Society started as an insurance services organization. It was once the largest Czech-American freethought fraternity in the United States.

History
The CSPS was founded in St. Louis, Missouri, in 1854, and, like other immigrant societies, began by offering a kind of insurance program, which provided for members when they were ill and covered funeral expenses. It was the "largest Bohemian fraternal organization".

The Czecho-Slovak Protective Society, headquartered in St. Louis, Missouri, joined in organizing the Czechoslovak Society of America in 1933.  That organization, based in Lombard, Illinois changed its name to CSA Fraternal Life in 1982.

Č.S.P.S. stands for "Česko-Slovenský Podporující Spolek" (Czech-Slovak Protective Society). These lodges were the forerunner of the (Západní Česko-Bratrská Jednota, or Western Bohemian Fraternal Association). Both associations offered a type of insurance for the Czech people. The association later became known as the Western Fraternal Life Association.

Local lodges

The first CSPS lodge in Cedar Rapids, Iowa, was started in 1879, and two more were started by 1882.  The C.S.P.S. Hall (Cedar Rapids, Iowa), was built during 1890-91 and expanded twice in the next two decades.  It is NRHP-listed in 1978.
The Grand Lodge Č.S.P.S. of Baltimore was founded in 1880.  The associated Bohemian National Cemetery, in Baltimore, Maryland, was started in 1884, and is listed on the National Register of Historic Places (NRHP).
The C.S.P.S. of Iowa City, Iowa, was organized in 1882 and built its Czecho Slovakian Association Hall in 1900.  The hall was listed on the NRHP in 1975.
The C.S.P.S. of Saint Paul, Minnesota built its C.S.P.S. hall in 1887;  it is also NRHP-listed.
Narodni Sin, Edwardsville, Illinois, built 1906, NRHP-listed
Czech Hall, Yukon, Oklahoma, built 1925, NRHP-listed
CSPS Lodge-Griesser Bakery, built 1890, in Bryan, Texas, NRHP-listed

References

 
Defunct organizations based in Missouri
Diaspora organizations in the United States
.
.
Ethnic fraternal orders in the United States
Organizations established in 1854
Organizations disestablished in 1933
1854 establishments in Missouri
1854 establishments in the United States
1933 disestablishments in the United States